Maria Cláudia Silva Carneiro (born February 6, 1963), known professionally as Cláudia Ohana (after the maternal surname of her mother, Nazareth Ohana Silva), is a Brazilian actress and singer of Portuguese and Jewish origin. In Brazil, she is best known for portraying the vampire Natasha in the 1991's telenovela Vamp, and also the wicked villain Isabela Ferreto in the 1995's A Próxima Vítima, however worldwide she is famous for her portrayal of Eréndira in the eponymous 1983 film.

Biography 
She is the daughter of film maker Nazareth Ohana Silva, who died in 1978, and the painter Arthur José Carneiro. She has an older sister named Cristina and is half-sister of the writer João Emanuel Carneiro.

Personal life 
Despite being the daughter of the film maker Nazareth Ohana, Cláudia was raised by her maternal aunt, Denise Ohana.

She was married to filmmaker Ruy Guerra between 1981 and 1984, with whom she had a daughter, named Dandara Guerra, born on October 10, 1983, also an actress. Cláudia is Martim's grandmother, born on May 24, 2005, and Arto, born on August 19, 2012, son of Dandara with the actor Álamo Facó. Cláudia is also the aunt of singer Bárbara Ohana.

She posed naked for Playboy for the first time in February 1985 and again in November 2008. Her 1985 essay became historic for showing a hairy pubis, a first even for the time. Recently, in a participation in the Amor e Sexo program, Cláudia joked about the subject, stating that, "to the frustration of many, I shave".

In July, 2020, Cláudia received widespread criticism from animal lovers for having adopted two dogs from a dog-rescue organization, then returning them only a few months later because she no longer wanted to care for them.

Career

Television

Film

References

External links 

1963 births
Living people
People from Rio de Janeiro (city)
Brazilian people of Jewish descent
Brazilian telenovela actresses
Brazilian film actresses
Brazilian stage actresses
Actresses from Rio de Janeiro (city)